Staufenberg is a village in Baden-Württemberg, Germany. It is administratively part of the town of Gernsbach in the Rastatt district.

Geography 

The village is located directly west of Gernsbach on a small tributary of the Murg River.

History 
The first documented mention of Staufenberg is as 'vinea Stoufenberg' in the year 1274. On January 1, 1971, Staufenberg was incorporated into the town of Gernsbach.

References

Villages in Baden-Württemberg